The First National Bank Building, known locally as the Bresee Tower, is a historic bank building at 2-4 N. Vermilion Street in Danville, Illinois. The building was constructed in 1918 for the First National Bank, which was established in 1857 and had operated in another building at the same site since 1867. Chicago architecture firm Mundie & Jensen designed the building in the Classical Revival style, a popular choice which was also used in several of Danville's other banks. Like many Classical Revival skyscrapers, the twelve-story building is divided into a two-story base, a shaft, and a one-story capital to resemble a Greek column. The entire exterior of the building is clad in terra cotta, and its decorative elements include pilasters, ornate metal entrance surrounds, and a bracketed entablature.

The building was added to the National Register of Historic Places on September 13, 2018.

Currently, the historic high-rise is in danger of being demolished and lost forever, the City of Danville has set aside funds for its demolition.

References

National Register of Historic Places in Vermilion County, Illinois
Bank buildings on the National Register of Historic Places in Illinois
Commercial buildings completed in 1918
Neoclassical architecture in Illinois
Buildings and structures in Danville, Illinois